Didem Taş (born March 31, 1992) is a Turkish women's football defender currently playing in the First League for Konak Belediyespor with jersey number 4, serving also as the captain. She is a member of the Turkish national team since 2009.

Career

Club

Didem Taş obtained her license from her hometown club Konak Belediyespor on November 3, 2006. She plays since then in the same club, and is currently serves as their captain.

At the end of the 2012–13 season, she enjoyed Women's First League championship. Taş played at the 2013–14 UEFA Women's Champions League in the qualification round matches in August 2013 and in the knockout stage matches in October 2013. She appeared in three matches of the 2015–16 UEFA Women's Champions League qualifying round.

At the end of the 2015–16 season, she enjoyed once again her team's champion title. She played in three matches of the Group 9 of the 2016–17 UEFA Women's Champions League qualifying round. Taş took part in three matches of the 2017–18 UEFA Women's Champions League qualifying round in Tbilisi, Georgia.

International
Taş made her first appearance in the Turkey girls' U-17 national team in the 2009 UEFA Women's U-17 Championship qualifying round match against Ireland on October 18, 2008. Playing against the teams Netherlands and Faroe Islands at the same tournament, she capped three times in total.

She was called up for the women's U-19 national team to play at the 2010 UEFA Women's U-19 Championship First qualifying round – Group 7 matches, and made her debut against the Serbian women on September 19, 2009. Taş participated in the following group matches of the tournament against France and Georgia. She capped three times in the women's U-19 national team.

Didem Taş played for the first time in the women's national team in the Kuban Spring Tournament match against Ukraine on March 14, 2009. After participating in a number of tournament and friendly matches, she played also against England and Montenegro at the 2015 FIFA Women's World Cup qualification – UEFA Group 6 matches. As of end 2013, she capped 19 times in the national team.

Career statistics
.

Honours 
 Turkish Women's First League
 Konak Belediyespor
 Winners (5): 2012–13, 2013–14, 2014–15, 2015–16, 2016–17
 Runners-up (2): 2010–11
 Third place (3): 2009–10, 2017–18, 2018–19

References

Living people
1992 births
People from Konak
Footballers from İzmir
Turkish women's footballers
Women's association football defenders
Turkey women's international footballers
Konak Belediyespor players
Turkish Women's Football Super League players